LOOP is an annual meeting point in Barcelona for video art.

The platform takes the form of a festival, a fair and conferences. Over a two-week period, the LOOP Festival presents works of 800 artists to nearly 200,000 visitors in 100 locations, from museums and restaurants, to shops across Barcelona.

The 44 galleries invited by the Committee for the LOOP Fair present recent works of emerging and well-known artists to 4000 professionals, journalists, curators, and collectors. This selection is completed with presentations of magazines and distribution companies.

LOOP has the support of the Government of Catalonia, the Spanish Ministry of Culture as well as other institutional and corporate sponsors.

History
2003

LOOP was created by the Barcelona Art Association in 2003 as a platform for active dissemination, discussion and creation of audiovisual art. Together with its network of professionals, the Barcelona Art Association wanted to contemplate video art as a way of removing the boundaries between art and society. LOOP emerged from the transformation of the New Art fair, which for seven editions had filled the rooms of a hotel. The LOOP Fair was held from November 27 to 30 at Hotel Barceló Sants in Barcelona.

2004

From November 18 to 21, 50 rooms on the first floor of the Hotel Barceló Sants were once again occupied by 50 galleries presenting video art. There was also an area of 900m2 in which institutions and museums could present their collections of video art. Magazines and publications specialized in contemporary art also occupied the Fair LOOP. To encourage collectors, LOOP'04 created a program of video art patronage, formed by a group of institutions and enterprises engaged in the acquisition of works presented at the fair. At the same time, arts centers, galleries and other spaces in Barcelona presented videos through the Off LOOP festival. A series of conferences in the media library of CaixaForum and a course organized by the Friends of the Museums of Catalunya were also scheduled.

2005

The LOOP Festival returned from November 7 to 20 with more than 350 participating artists presenting their video art works along 8 main routes: Route El Raval, Route Eixample, Route Calle Montcada, Route Montjuïc, Route Gràcia, Route Born/Ciutat Vella, Route Playa and Route Nau Ivanow. The Video London exhibition, with more than 150 participants, included the panorama of contemporary video art by young artists who study, work or exhibit in London. The LOOP Fair was held from November 10 to 13. The 52 invited galleries from different countries presented recent works at the Hotel Barceló Sants.

2006

The fourth edition of the LOOP Fair, from May 19 to 21, offered international premieres in the rooms of Hotel Pulitzer. In addition, a parallel space, called Video Zone, presented the collections of video art distributors as well as a sample of contemporary art magazines. Also, the fair hosted video feedback, three days of presentations by collectors, panel discussions, lectures and workshops on key issues and practical matters in the field of video art. From May 10 to 21 the festival of LOOP'06 was held.

2007

In its fifth edition, from May 23 to June 3, 180,000 visitors saw works from over 800 artists in 108 spaces, from institutions like the CCCB and the MACBA to restaurants and shops, presenting 66 curated programs, 20 universities and 20 international festivals. LOOP'07 has established itself as a centre for premieres. The 43 galleries selected for the LOOP Fair presented their artists to 4,000 international professionals, journalists, curators, and collectors in Hotel Catalonia Ramblas. In the conferences were involved the heads of major institutions in the sector, such as the MoMA, Tate Modern, the MNACRS, the Pompidou Centre and the ZKM. For the first time in Barcelona it was possible to see the whole work of artist Matthew Barney.

2008

The sixth edition, LOOP'08, opened its doors from 6–18 May 2008. The LOOP Festival showed the works of more than 800 artists in 142 spaces across the city. The program LOOP Diverse, which was created the previous year with the objective of exploring the possibilities of video art as a vehicle of intercultural dialog, was stimulated on the occasion of the European Year of Intercultural Dialogue 2008. During this edition the 16 principal collectives of Barcelona’s residential immigrants were involved, and works from their countries of origin has been shown in 37 establishments. The program was closed by a round table in the CCCB with the artists Hannah Collins and M. Rosa Jijón. The LOOP Fair occupied 44 rooms in the Hotel Catalonia Ramblas, where 44 proposals from participating galleries were exhibited.

Awards
The awards are the following: 
Screen Projects Award. In recognition of the best contribution made by a gallery present at the Fair, awarded 2000 Euros and the invitation to participate in the next edition.
LOOP Catalonia Award. 6000 Euros are awarded to the gallery with the best work.
MACBA Award. The video art work will become part of the artistic background of the MACBA.

References

External links

Spanish contemporary art
Video art
Festivals in Catalonia
Culture in Barcelona